The 1985 AFC Youth Championship was held in March, 1985 in Abu Dhabi, United Arab Emirates. The tournament was won by for the first time by China PR in the final tournaments in round-robin format.

Qualification

Qualified teams
  (West Asia zone winners)
  (West Asia zone runners-up)
  (East Asia zone winners)
  (East Asia zone runners-up)

Final standing

Match results

Winner

 China PR, Saudi Arabia qualified for 1985 FIFA World Youth Championship.

1985
1985
Youth
AFC
1985 in youth association football